Boğaziçi Üniversitesi, also named Rumeli Hisarüstü, is an underground rapid transit station on the M6 line of the Istanbul Metro. It is located in northeast Beşiktaş under Hisar Üstü Nispetiye Avenue. The station is named after the Boğaziçi University which is located right next to it.

Connection to the F4 funicular line is available to go to Aşiyan on the Bosphorus.

Layout

M6 Platform

F4 Platform

References

Istanbul metro stations
Metro Station
Beşiktaş
Railway stations opened in 2015
2015 establishments in Turkey
Rapid transit stations under construction in Turkey